Heuberg may refer to:

Places

 in Germany:
 Heuberg/Buchhorn/Gleichen, village in the municipality of Pfedelbach, Hohenlohekreis, Baden-Württemberg
 Heuberg (Buchenbach), village in the municipality of Buchenbach, Breisgau-Hochschwarzwald, Baden-Württemberg
 Heuberg (Herrieden), village in the borough of Herrieden, Ansbach, Bavaria
 Heuberg (Hilpoltstein), village in the borough of Hilpoltstein, Roth, Bavaria
 Heuberg (Oettingen), village in the borough of Oettingen, Donau-Ries, Bavaria
 Heuberg (Waltenhofen), village in the municipality of Waltenhofen, Oberallgäu, Bavaria
 Heuberg (Weißenburg), village in the municipality of Weißenburg-Gunzenhausen, Bavaria
 Heuberg (Westerheim), village in the municipality of Westerheim, Alb-Donau-Kreis, Baden-Württemberg

 in Austria:
 Heuberg, cadastral municipality of Koppl, Salzburg-Umgebung, Salzburg
 Heuberg (Lanzenkirchen), hamlet in Lanzenkirchen, Wiener Neustadt-Land, Lower Austria
 Heuberg (Lassing), village in Lassing, Liezen, Styria
 Heuberg (Lend), village in Lend, Zell am See, Salzburg Land
 Heuberg (Oberaich), village in Oberaich, Bruck-Mürzzuschlag, Styria
 Heuberg (Pyhra), cadastral municipality of Pyhra, Sankt Pölten-Land, Lower Austria
 Heuberg (Scheffau), village in Scheffau am Tennengebirge, Hallein, Salzburger state of
 Heuberg (Scheibbs), village in Scheibbs, Scheibbs, Lower Austria
 Heuberg (Serfaus), village near Serfaus, Landeck, Tyrol
 Heuberg (Stans), village in Stans, district of  Schwaz, Tyrol

Structures
 Schloss Heuberg, castle in the municipality of Bruck an der Großglocknerstraße, Zell am See, Salzburg, Austria
 Lager Heuberg, part of the Bundeswehr's military base in the region around the Großer Heuberg, near Stetten am kalten Markt, Sigmaringen, Baden-Württemberg, Germany
 Heuberg Transmitter, on the Heuberg, near Forchtenstein, Mattersburg, Burgenland, Austria

Mountain regions, mountains and hills

 in Germany:
 Heuberg (Chiemgau Alps) (1337.6 m), in the Chiemgau Alps near Nußdorf am Inn, Rosenheim, Bavaria
 Großer Heuberg (up to 1015 m), region of the Swabian Jura in Zollernalbkreis, Sigmaringen and Tuttlingen, Baden-Württemberg
 Heuberg (Black Forest) (709.1 m), in the Black Forest near Neuenbürg, Enzkreis, Baden-Württemberg
 Kleiner Heuberg (c. 700 m), region of the Swabian Jura in Zollernalbkreis and Rottweil, Baden-Württemberg
 Heuberg (Tübingen) (497.9 m), near Waldhausen (Tübingen), Tübingen, Baden-Württemberg
 Heuberg (Rottenburg am Neckar) (483.5 m), near Rottenburg am Neckar, Tübingen, Baden-Württemberg – with the Heuberger Warte
 Heuberg (Welzheim Forest) (476.6 m), in the Welzheim Forest southwest of Walkersbach (Plüderhausen), Rems-Murr-Kreis, Baden-Württemberg
 Heuberg (Hofgeismar Municipal Forest) (392 m), in the Hofgeismar Municipal Forest near Hofgeismar, Kassel, Hesse – with a radio and TV tower
 Heuberg (Spessart) (365 m), in the Spessart near Frammersbach, Main-Spessart, Bavaria; see Frammersbach#Hills
 Heuberg (Kiffing) (344 m), in the Kiffing near Oedelsheim (Oberweser), Kassel, Hesse – with transmission tower

 in Austria:
 Heuberg (Allgäu Alps) (1795 m), in the Kleinwalsertal, Vorarlberg
 Heuberg (Brandenberg Alps) (1746 m), in the Brandenberg Alps, Tyrol
 Heuberg (Salzburg) (901 m), hill country and landscape area east of the Salzburg suburb of Gnigl, Salzburg, Salzburg state
 Heuberg (Rosalia Mountains) (748 m), in the Rosalia Mountains near Forchtenstein, Mattersburg, Burgenland – with the Heuberg Transmitter
 Heuberg (Hallein) (556 m), in the Salzach valley near Hallein, Hallein, Salzburg state
 Heuberg (Vienna Woods), in the market municipality of St. Andrä-Wördern, Tulln, Lower Austria
 Heuberg (Vienna) (464 m), in the 17th Vienna district of Hernals

Other
 Heuberg (nature reserve), a nature reserve  in Zollernalbkreis, Baden-Württemberg

See also 

Hoiberg
Hooiberg